The Diocese of Saint Clement at Saratov is a Latin Church ecclesiastical territory or diocese in Russia. The diocese's episcopal see is located in the city of Saratov. The Diocese of Saint Clement at Saratov is a suffragan diocese in the ecclesiastical province of the metropolitan Mother of God at Moscow.

History
 November 23, 1999: Established as Apostolic Administration of Southern European Russia from the Apostolic Administration of European Russia
 February 11, 2002: Promoted as Diocese of Saint Clement at Saratov

Leadership
 Bishops of Saint Clement at Saratov (Roman rite)
 Bishop Clemens Pickel (since 2002.02.11)
 Apostolic Administrators of Southern European Russia (Roman rite)
 Bishop Clemens Pickel (1999.11.23 – 2002.02.11)

Churches
Church of the Exaltation of the Holy Cross, Tambov
Immaculate Heart of Mary Church, Kemerovo
St. Liborius Church, Krasnodar
St. Nicholas' Church, Volgograd
The Last Supper Church, Rostov-on-Don
Transfiguration Church, Pyatigorsk

See also
Roman Catholicism in Russia

References

Sources
 GCatholic.org
 Catholic Hierarchy

External links

  Website of the Diocese
  Saint Clement's 

Roman Catholic dioceses in Russia
Christian organizations established in 1999
Roman Catholic dioceses and prelatures established in the 20th century
1999 establishments in Russia